The 2020 Icelandic Women's Cup also known as the Mjólkurbirkarinn kvenna is the 
40th edition of Icelandic national cup. Selfoss were the defending champions after defeating KR at the last tournament's final.

Calendar
Below are the dates for each round as given by the official schedule:

First round
14 teams began the cup in the first round, with 8 teams coming from the 2. deild kvenna (second division) and 6 teams from the 1. deild kvenna (first division)

|colspan="3" style="background-color:#97DEFF"|6 June 2020

|-
|colspan="3" style="background-color:#97DEFF"|7 June 2020

|}

Second round
The second round will be played on 13 June 2020 and 14 June 2020. 12 teams will complete, seven winners from the first round, one team from the 2. deild kvenna and four teams from the 1. deild kvenna.

|colspan="3" style="background-color:#97DEFF"|13 June 2020

|-
|colspan="3" style="background-color:#97DEFF"|14 June 2020

|}

Third round
The third round will be played on 10 July 2020 and 11 July 2020 and will consist of 16 teams. The six winners of the second round and the ten Úrvalsdeild teams entered this round.

|colspan="3" style="background-color:#97DEFF"|10 July 2020

|-
|colspan="3" style="background-color:#97DEFF"|11 July 2020

|}

Quarter-finals
The quarter-final matches were originally scheduled to be played on 11 & 12 August 2020 but were later moved to 3 September 2020.

|}

Semi-finals
Matches will be played on 1 November 2020

|}

Final
Match will be played on 6 November 2020 at the Laugardalsvöllur

|}

Note:- Due to the COVID-19 pandemic, spectators were not allowed into stadiums.

Topscorers

References

External links
 Icelandic Football Federation Official website

 2020 Icelandic Women's Cup at Soccerway

2020 in Icelandic women's football
2020 domestic association football cups